Torsö Crater is a small impact crater in the Argyre quadrangle of Mars, located at 44.29° S and 51.18° W. It is  in diameter. Its name was approved in 1976 by the International Astronomical Union (IAU) Working Group for Planetary System Nomenclature (WGPSN), and refers to a town in Sweden. Along the rim of Torsö Crater, a number of gullies are visible.

See also 
 List of craters on Mars: O-Z

References 

Impact craters on Mars
Argyre quadrangle